Krāslava is a town and the administrative centre of Krāslava Municipality, in the Latgale region of Latvia. The town lies on the Daugava, upstream and to the east of the city of Daugavpils.

History
 Krāslava was an important hillfort on the waterway from the Varangians to the Byzantine Empire since early Middle Ages, part of the orthodox Principality of Jersika in the 13th century.
 In 1558 was mentioned for the first time in written sources of Livonian Order as Kreslau (in German).
 In 1676 the church was built by Jesuit Order and Krāslava became the most northern located center of the Jesuit movement on the border with the areas dominated by Protestant and Orthodox churches.
 In 1729 Count Ludvig Plater bought Krāslava. For nearly two centuries the Plater family determined Kraslava economical and cultural life.
 Craftmen from Poland and Germany in co-operation with local people organized the production of carpets, velvet, silk and cotton material, weapons, jewellery and other goods. The goods were in demand at the four Kraslava fairs and also exported to Courland, Poland and Germany.
 Between 1757 and 1842 Krāslava was home for a Roman Catholic seminary, one of the first educational institutions in Latgale region.

Prominent residents 
 writer Kazimierz Bujnicki
 Sculptor Naoum Aronson (1872-1943)
 Signatorie to the Act of Independence of Lithuania Donatas Malinauskas
 Philosopher Nikolai Lossky
 Writer and philosopher Konstantin Raudive
 Monsignor Konstantin Budkevich – Roman Catholic priest executed in the Lubyanka Prison on Easter Sunday 1923.
 athlete Ineta Radēviča
 athlete Valentīna Gotovska
 Basketball player Jānis Timma
 Opera Singer and Professor Katrina Krumpane
 Siarhiej Sacharaŭ (1880-1954), Belarusian folklorist, ethnographer, pedagogue.
 Mocieĺ Blinčykaŭ (1896-1935), leader of the revolutionary movement in Western Belarus.

Gallery

See also

 Krāslava New Palace
 Krāslava Old Palace
 List of cities in Latvia

References

External links
 
 Krāslava Municipality website

 
Towns in Latvia
1923 establishments in Latvia
Krāslava Municipality
Dvinsky Uyezd